Korean nationalism can be viewed in two different contexts. One encompasses various movements throughout history to maintain a Korean cultural identity, history, and ethnicity (or "race"). This ethnic nationalism was mainly forged in opposition to foreign incursion and rule. The second context encompasses how Korean nationalism changed after the partition in 1945. Today, the former tends to predominate.

The term "pure blood" refers to the belief that Korean people are a pure race descended from a single ancestor. Invoked during the period of resistance to colonial rule, the idea gave Koreans a sense of ethnic homogeneity and national pride, and a potential catalyst for racial discrimination and prejudice.

The dominant strand of nationalism in South Korea, tends to be romantic in nature (specifically ethnic or "racial"), rather than civic. This form of romantic nationalism often competes with and weakens the more formal and structured civic national identity. South Koreans' lack of state-derived nationalism (i.e. patriotism) manifests itself in various ways. For example, there is no national holiday solely commemorating the state itself and many South Koreans do not know the exact date their country was founded (i.e. 15 August 1948).

Romantic ethnic nationalism in North Korea has strong salience as well, though unlike in South Korea, civic nationalism and ethnic nationalism do not compete but rather co-exist and reinforce each other. This can be attributed to the state-sponsored ideology of Juche, which utilizes ethnic identity to enhance state power and control.

In South Korea, Korean nationalism is largely divided into two categories: "ethnic nationalism", which has no significant connection with political movements and is somewhat racist, and non-racist/anti-imperialist "liberal nationalism", which forms a political center-left camp and is modernized and refined.

History

Historically, the central objectives of Korea's nationalist movement were the advancement and protection of Korea's ancient culture and national identity from foreign influence, and the fostering of the independence movement during Japanese rule. In order to obtain political and cultural autonomy, it first had to promote Korea's cultural dependency. For this reason, the nationalist movement demanded the restoration and preservation of Korea's traditional culture. The Donghak (Eastern Learning) peasant movement, also known as the Donghak Peasant Revolution, that began in the 1870s, could be seen as an early form of what would become the Korean nationalist resistance movement against foreign influences. It was succeeded by the Righteous Army movement and later a series of Korean resistance movements that led, in part, to the current status of the two Korean nations.

National resistance movements

Nationalism in late 19th century Korea was a form of resistance movements, but with significant differences between the north and south. Since the intrusion by foreign powers in the late 19th century, Koreans have had to construct their identity in ways that pitted them against foreigners. They have witnessed and participated in a wide range of nationalist actions over the past century, but all of them have been some form of resistance against foreign influences. During the colonial period, the Korean nationalists carried on the struggle for independence, fighting against Imperial Japan in Korea, China particularly Manchuria and China Proper and Far East Russia. They formed 'governments in exile', armies, and secret groups to fight the imperial Japanese wherever they are.

Partition of Korea

Korea was divided at the 38th parallel between north and south by the Allied powers in 1945 as part of the disarmament of Imperial Japan, and the division persists to this day. The split is perpetuated by rival regimes, opposing ideologies, and global politics; it is further deepened by a differing sense of national identity derived from the unique histories, polities, class systems, and gender roles experienced by Koreans on different sides of the border. As a result, Korean nationalism in the late 20th century has been permeated by the split between North and South. Each regime espouses its own distinctive form of nationalism, different from the opposing side's, that nonetheless seeks to encompass the entire Korean Peninsula in its scope.

Korean reunification

With regard to Korean nationalism, the reunification of the two Koreas is a highly related issue. Ethnic nationalism that is prevalent in Korean society is likely to play a significant role in the unification process, if it does occur. As Gi-Wook Shin claims, "Ethnic consciousness would not only legitimize the drive for unification but it could also be a common ground, especially in the early stages of the unification process, that is needed to facilitate a smooth integration of the two systems."

Korean reunification (Korean: 남북통일) refers to the hypothetical future reunification of North and South Korea under a single government. South Korea had adopted a sunshine policy towards the North that was based on the hope that one day, the two countries would be re-united in the 1990s. The process towards this was started by the historic June 15th North–South Joint Declaration in August 2000, where the two countries agreed to work towards a peaceful reunification in the future. However, there are a number of hurdles in this process due to the large political and economic differences between the two countries and other state actors such as China, Russia, and the United States. Short-term problems such as a large number of refugees that would migrate from the North into the South and initial economic and political instability would need to be overcome.

State-aligned nationalism

North Korea

In North Korea, nationalism is incorporated as part of the state-sponsored ideology of Juche. The Juche Idea teaches that "man is the master of everything and decides everything", and the Korean people are the masters of Korea's revolution. Juche is a component of North Korea's political system. The word literally means "main body" or "subject"; it has also been translated in North Korean sources as "independent stand" and the "spirit of self-reliance".

The Juche Idea gradually emerged as a systematic ideological doctrine in the 1960s. Kim Il-sung outlined the three fundamental principles of Juche as being:
"independence in politics" (자주, 自主, chaju).
"self-sustenance in the economy" (자립, 自立, charip).
"self-defense in national defense" (자위, 自衛, chawi).

Unlike South Koreans, North Koreans generally believe that their (North Korean) state and the "Korean race" (minjok) are analogous. Thus they strengthen each other rather than undermining the other like in South Korea:

Even North Koreans who may not particularly admire their country's leaders will still be patriotic towards their state. The North Korean state's symbols, such as the national emblem and flag, have been cited as an example of North Korea's attempt to build a civic-based nationalism, in contrast to South Korea's state symbols, which utilize overtly racialized motifs and ethnic symbolism.

South Korea

State-based nationalism (or patriotism) in South Korea is weak, compared with the more salient race-based nationalism. As a result, some commentators have described the South Korean state in the eyes of South Koreans as constituting "an unloved republic". Whereas in North Korea, most of its citizens view their state and race as being the same thing, most South Koreans on the other hand tend to see the "Korean race" and their (South Korean) state as being separate entities due to the existence of a competing Korean state in North Korea. According to Korea scholar Brian Reynolds Myers, a professor at Dongseo University, while race-based nationalism in North Korea strengthens patriotism towards the state and vice versa, in South Korea it undermines it:

Due to traditional state support for race nationalism fostered during the 20th century, South Koreans have come to view positive achievements as being a result of inherent racial characteristics, whereas negative events are attributed to the incompetence and malevolence of the South Korean state:

It is said that one of the reasons the South Korean state during the 20th century decided to extol race-based nationalism over civic nationalism was that being an authoritarian military junta at the time, it did not want to extol republican principles that might be used to criticize it in turn. That said, civic state-based nationalism was said to have been stronger during those years than in contemporary post-democratization South Korea, albeit still tenuous. Ironically, though fostered by a right-wing regime at the time, today race nationalism in South Korea is shared across the political spectrum. For instance, when the South Korean pledge of allegiance was reworded in 2007 to use less racialist language, it was left-leaning South Koreans who notably objected to a change.

South Koreans' lack of state-based nationalism (or patriotism) manifests itself in various ways in the country's society. For example, there is no national holiday solely commemorating the state itself and many South Koreans do not know the exact date their country was founded. The closest analogue, Constitution Day, ceased to be a national holiday in 2008. The Liberation Day holiday, which is celebrated each August, shares its date with the establishment of the South Korean state. However, celebrations during the holiday choose to forgo commemorations of the South Korean state or its establishment in favor of focusing and extolling other aspects. As a result, many South Koreans do not know the exact date their own state was established, in contrast to North Koreans, who do. In contrast, a holiday marking the mythological formation of the "Korean race" in 2333 BC is commemorated with a national holiday in South Korea each October.

The "Hell Chosun" phenomenon and a desire among many South Koreans to immigrate have also been cited as an example of South Koreans' general lack of nationalistic patriotism towards their state. The lack of state-based nationalism manifests itself in diplomacy as well; the lack of a strong, resolute response by South Korea to North Korea's attacks against it in 2010 (i.e. the sinking of ROKS Cheonan and the bombardment of Yeonpyeong) has been attributed to the former's lack of state-aligned nationalistic sentiment, as these attacks were viewed as mere affronts against the state. In contrast, Japanese claims to South Korean-claimed territory are seen as affronts against the Korean race and are thus responded to with more vigor from South Koreans.

Even state symbols that are ostensibly civic in nature, such as the national anthem, state emblem, and national flag contain racial nationalist references (such as the mugunghwa flower) instead of republican or civic ones. Thus, the South Korean flag is often seen by South Koreans as representing the "Korean race" rather than merely South Korea itself. As a result, the vast majority of South Koreans will almost always treat their national flag with reverence and respect, compared to other countries where citizens would desecrate their own national flags as political statements or in protest. This weak state-based nationalism was reflected in the pre-2011 South Korean military oath and pre-2007 pledge of allegiance, both of which pledged allegiance to the "Korean race" over the state.

One of the reasons put forth to explain South Koreans' lack of support or affinity for the South Korean state is due to a popular misconception that only North Korea purged its regime of pro-Japanese collaborators of the colonial period and that South Korea did not, while in reality the former did not do so. Another reason given is that South Koreans view their interactions with their state in negative contexts, such as when having to report for mandatory military service or paying fines.

Particular issues

Anti-Japanese sentiment

Contemporary Korean nationalism, at least in South Korea, often incorporates anti-Japanese sentiment as a core component of its ideology, even being described by some scholars as constituting an integral part of South Korea's civil religion.

The legacy of the colonial period of Korean history continues to fuel recriminations and demands for restitution in both Koreas. North and South Korea have both lodged severe protests against visits by Japanese officials to the Yasukuni Shrine, which is seen as glorifying the Class A war criminals whose remains are held there. South Koreans claim that a number of Korean women who worked near Japanese military bases as comfort women were forced to serve as sex slaves against their will for Japanese soldiers during World War II which had been a persistent thorn in the side of Japan-South Korea relations from the 1990s to the 2010s. Disagreements over demands for reparations and a formal apology still remain unresolved despite the previous agreement and compensation in 1965, South Koreans started peaceful vigils in 1992 held by survivors on a weekly basis. Recent Japanese history textbook controversies have emerged as a result of what some see as an attempt at historical negationism with the aim of whitewashing or ignoring Japan's war crimes during World War II. These issues continue to separate the two countries diplomatically, and provide fuel for nationalism in both Koreas as well as anti-Japanese sentiment.

According to Robert E. Kelly, a professor at Pusan National University, anti-Japanese sentiment in South Korea stems not just from Japanese atrocities during the occupation period, but also from the Korean Peninsula's division. As a result, Kelly says, South Koreans take out their anger, whether rising from Korean division or otherwise, against Japan, as due to the racialized nature of Korean nationalism it is considered gauche for South Koreans to be overly hostile towards North Korea. This view is supported by another professor, Brian Reynolds Myers of Dongseo University. Theoretical explanation for the link between Korean division and persistent anti-Japanese sentiment has been offered in scholarship utilizing an ontological security framework.

Liancourt Rocks dispute

The Liancourt Rocks dispute has been ongoing since the end of World War II after the United States rejected Korea's claim to give sovereignty of the Liancourt Rocks islands, known as Dokdo or Tokto (독도/獨島, literally "solitary island") in Korean and Takeshima in Japanese, to Korea in the 1951.

Since 1954, the South Koreans have administered the islands but bickering on both sides involving nationalism and lingering historical acrimony has led to the current impasse. Adding to this problem is political pressure from conservative politicians and nationalist groups in both South Korea and Japan to have more assertive territorial policies.

Tensions escalated in 1996 when both governments declared a  EEZ that encompassed the island, which brought Japan-South Korean relations to an all-time low.

This has not only complicated bilateral relations but heightened nationalist sentiments on both sides. In spite of generational change and the passage of time, the institutionalization of Korean collective memory is causing young Koreans to be as anti-Japanese, if not more so, than the older generation. For Koreans, "historical memory and feelings of han (resentment) run deeply and can influence Korea's relations with its neighbors, allies, and enemies in ways not easily predicted by models of policy-making predicated on realpolitik or other geo-strategic or economic concerns."

Due to Korea's colonial past, safeguarding the island has become equivalent to safeguarding the nation-state and its national identity. A territory's value and importance is not limited to its physical dimensions but also the psychological value it holds as a source of sovereignty and identity. Triggered by perceptions and strong feelings of injustice and humiliation, Korean nationalistic sentiment has become involved in the dispute. The island itself has become to symbolize South Korean national identity and pride, making it an issue even more difficult to resolve. South Korea's claim to the island holds emotional content that goes beyond material significance, and giving way on the island issue to Japan would be seen as compromising the sovereignty of the entire peninsula. The dispute has taken on the form of a national grievance rather than a simple territorial dispute.

The South Korean government has also played a role in fanning nationalism in this dispute. President Roh Moo-hyun began a speech on Korea-Japan relations in April 2006 by bluntly stating, "The island is our land" and "for Koreans, the island is a symbol of the complete recovery of sovereignty." The issue of the island is clearly tied to the protection of the nation-state that was once taken away by Japan. President Roh emphasizes this point again by saying:

Later on in his speech Roh also mentions the Yasukuni Shrine and Japanese history textbook controversy, saying that they will be dealt with together. Having placed the Liancourt Rocks issue "in the context of rectifying the historical record between Korea and Japan" and "the safeguarding of [Korea's] sovereignty", compromise becomes impossible. As the French theorist Ernest Renan said, "Where national memories are concerned, griefs are of more value than triumphs, for they impose duties, and require a common effort."

The Liancourt Rocks dispute has affected the Korean and Japanese perceptions of each other. According to a 2008 survey by Gallup Korea and the Japan Research Center, 20% of Koreans had friendly feelings towards Japan and 36% of Japanese the same towards Korea. When asked for the reason of their antipathy, most Koreans mentioned the territorial dispute over the island, and the Japanese the anti-Japanese sentiment in Korea. This is in contrast to a 2002 survey (post 2002 FIFA World Cup) conducted by the Chosun Ilbo and Mainichi Shimbun, where 35% of Koreans and 69% of Japanese had friendly views of the other country.

Anti-U.S. sentiment

Anti-Americanism in Korea began with the earliest contact between the two nations and continued after the division of Korea. In both North Korea and South Korea, anti-Americanism after the Korean War has focused on the presence and behavior of American military personnel (USFK), aggravated especially by high-profile accidents or crimes by U.S. servicemembers, with various crimes including rape and assault, among others.

The 2002 Yangju highway incident especially ignited Anti-American passions. The ongoing U.S. military presence in South Korea, especially at the Yongsan Garrison (on a base previously used by the Imperial Japanese Army during Colonial Korea) in central Seoul, remains a contentious issue. While protests have arisen over specific incidents, they are often reflective of deeper historical resentments. Robert Hathaway, director of the Wilson Center's Asia program, suggests: "the growth of anti-American sentiment in both Japan and South Korea must be seen not simply as a response to American policies and actions, but as reflective of deeper domestic trends and developments within these Asian countries."

Korean anti-Americanism after the war was fueled by American occupation of USFK troops and support for the authoritarian rule of Park Chung-hee, and what was perceived as an American endorsement of the brutal tactics used in the Gwangju massacre. Speaking to the Wilson Center, Katherine Moon was noted by Hathaway as suggesting that "anti-Americanism also represents the collective venting of accumulated grievances that in many instances have lain hidden for decades", but that despite the "very public demonstrations of anger toward the United States [...] the majority of Koreans of all age groups supports the continuation of the American alliance."

Manchuria and Gando disputes

Historical Korean claims of Manchuria can be traced back to the late Joseon dynasty. It was common in late Joseon dynasty to write about old lands of Goguryeo, an expression of nostalgia for the north. In the early 20th century, Korean nationalist historians like Shin Chaeho, advocated a complete unification of Korean peninsula and Manchuria in order to restore the ancient lands of Dangun.

Today, Irredentist Korean nationalist historians have claimed that Manchuria (now called Northeast China), in particular Gando (known in China as Jiandao), a region bordering China, North Korea, and Russia, and home to the Yanbian Korean Autonomous Prefecture should be part of Korea, based on ancient Gojoseon, Goguryeo and Balhae control of the area. The term Greater Korea, sometimes used in nationalist works, usually enompasses those regions located. The claim for Gando is said to be stronger than the claim for the whole of Manchuria, due to later Balhae presence in Gando after the fall of the Koguryo kingdom, the current area population's consisting of 1/3 ethnic Koreans, and the circumstances of the 1909 Gando Convention that relegated the area to Chinese control. While the Manchurian claims have not received official attention in South Korea, claims for Gando were the subject of a bill introduced in 2004, at a time when China had been claiming that Balhae and Koguryo had been "minority states" within China and the resulting controversy was at its height. The legislation proposed by 59 South Korean lawmakers would have declared the Gando Convention signed under Japanese rule to be "null and void". Later that year, the two countries reached an understanding that their governments would refrain from further involvement in the historical controversy.

Ethnic nationalism

Ethnic nationalism emphasizes descent and race. Among many Koreans, both in the North and South, ethnicity is interpreted on a racial basis, with "blood", and is usually considered the key determinant in defining "Koreanness" in contemporary Korean nationalist thought. In South Korea, ethnic nationalism has salience to the point where it has been described as being a part of the country's civil religion. Despite its contemporary salience, ethnic Korean nationalism is a relatively recent development.

According to him, the Korean people were descendants of Dangun Joseon, who merged with Buyo of Manchuria to form the Goguryeo people. This original blend, Shin contended, remained the ethnic or racial core of the Korean nation and also see Even today, Koreans maintain a strong sense of ethnic homogeneity based on shared blood and ancestry, and nationalism continues to function as a key resource in Korean politics and foreign relations.</ref> A survey in 2006 showed that 68.2% of respondents considered "blood" the most important criterion of defining the Korean nation, and 74.9% agreed that "Koreans are all brothers and sisters regardless of residence and ideology."

Noted Korea scholar Brian Reynolds Myers argues in his 2010 book The Cleanest Race: How North Koreans See Themselves and Why It Matters that the North Korean ideology of a purest race arose from 20th century Japanese fascism. Japanese collaborators are said to have introduced the notion of racial unity in an effort to assert that Japanese and Koreans came from the same racial stock. After Japan relinquished control of Korea, Myers argues, the theory was subsequently adjusted to promote the idea of a pure Korean race.

A poll by the Asan Institute for Policy Studies in 2015 found that only 5.4% of South Koreans in their twenties said they saw North Koreans as people sharing the same bloodline with South Koreans The poll also found that only 11 percent of South Koreans associated North Korea with Koreans, with most people associating them with words like military, war or nuclear weapons. It also found that most South Koreans expressed deeper feelings of "closeness" with Americans and Chinese than with North Koreans.

Nationalist historiography

Shin Chaeho was the first historian to focus on the Korean minjok (민족, 民族, "race" or ethnicity) or Kyŏre(겨레), and narrated Korean history in terms of its minjok history. There is no direct English language equivalent for the word minjok, though commentators have offered "race" and "ethnicity" as being the closest analogues. For Shin, minjok and history were mutually defining and as he says in the preface of the Doksa Sillon, "if one dismisses the minjok, there is no history." Shin emphasized the ancientness of the Korean minjok history, elevated the status of the semi-legendary figure, Dangun, as the primordial ancestor of the Korean people and located the host minjok, Puyo. Shin launched a vision of the Korean nation as a historically defined minjok or ethnicity entity. In an attempt to counter China's controversial Northeast Project and Goguryeo controversies that ensued, the South Korean government in 2007 incorporated the founding of Gojoseon of the year 2333 BCE into its textbooks.

See also 
 Anti-imperialism
 Irish nationalism
 Korean diaspora - In South Korea, Korean nationalists share a common view that South Korean citizenship should be granted on a much more generous condition to 'Korean ethnic/race people foreigners' than 'non-Korean ethnic/race people foreigners'.
 Korean nationalist historiography

Notes

References

Bibliography

Journals
 
 
 
 
 Deacon, Chris (2023). Perpetual ontological crisis: national division, enduring anxieties and South Korea's discursive relationship with Japan. European Journal of International Relations, doi:10.1177/13540661221143925.

News

Academic/Educational
 Lee, Chong-Sik (1963). The Politics of Korean Nationalism (Berkeley: University of California Press).
 
 
 
 
  This can also be found as a chapter in a book called "Power and the Past: Collective Memory and International Relations". 
  - Presented at U.S.-Korea Relations in the 21st Century Challenges and Prospects, Washington, D.C.

Books

External links

Anti-Chinese sentiment in Korea
Anti-imperialism in Korea
Anti-Japanese sentiment in Korea
Cultural regions
Foreign relations of North Korea
Foreign relations of South Korea
Korean irredentism
 
Nationalism by country
Nationalist movements in Asia
North Korea–South Korea relations
Pan-nationalism
Politics of Korea
Society of Korea